The Church of San Fermín de los Navarros (Spanish: Iglesia de San Fermín de los Navarros) is a church located in Madrid, Spain. It is dedicated to Saint Fermin (who is associated with Navarre), and replaces an earlier church dedicated to the saint which was demolished to make way for the Bank of Spain.

Projected by Eugenio Jiménez Corera and Carlos Velasco Peinado, the building is constructed from brick. It mixes Neo-Mudéjar and Gothic Revival elements. The Gothic style is employed in the interior, whereas the Mudejar elements are more typical of the exterior. It was designed in 1886 and finished in 1890. It was inaugurated on 6 July 1890.

Conservation 
Some of the contents of the church were lost in the Spanish Civil War.

The building was declared Bien de Interés Cultural (asset of cultural interest) on 20 April 1995.

See also 
Catholic Church in Spain
List of oldest church buildings

References 

Fermin Navarros
Roman Catholic churches completed in 1890
19th-century Roman Catholic church buildings in Spain
Bien de Interés Cultural landmarks in Madrid
Buildings and structures in Almagro neighborhood, Madrid